Igor Trajkovski (born November 3, 1980) is a former Macedonian professional basketball guard who last played for MZT Skopje.

References

External links
 Borce Domlevski Player Profile, KK Millenium Strumica, News, Stats - Eurobasket

1980 births
Living people
Macedonian men's basketball players
Guards (basketball)